Humerana lateralis is a species of frog in the family Ranidae. It is found in Cambodia, Laos, Myanmar, Thailand, and Vietnam. It is commonly known as Kokarit frog, yellow frog or (ambiguously) wood frog.

Placed in Rana when this was still loosely circumscribed, it was since assigned to the "water frog" genus Pelophylax. However, it is not clear whether this is the most appropriate treatment, and the Kokarit frog might rather belong in Hylarana. In 2015, it was classified into Humerana based on phylogenetic evidence. The supposed species Rana nigrolineata was recently determined to be a junior synonym of H. lateralis.

Habitat
Its natural habitats are subtropical or tropical dry forest, subtropical or tropical moist lowland forest, subtropical or tropical dry lowland grassland,  moist shrubland, plantations, swamps, freshwater marshes, intermittent freshwater marshes, ponds, and seasonally flooded or irrigated agricultural land. It is not considered threatened by the IUCN.

Consumption
In parts of Cambodia north and east of the Mekong River, it is collected for human consumption in localities such as Snuol District, Kratie Province.

Footnotes

References
 
 

Humerana
Amphibians of Myanmar
Amphibians of Cambodia
Amphibians of China
Amphibians of Laos
Amphibians of Thailand
Amphibians of Vietnam
Amphibians described in 1887
Taxonomy articles created by Polbot